Naldöken can refer to:

 Naldöken, Ardanuç
 Naldöken, Ayvacık
 Naldöken, Maden
 Naldöken railway station